In 2013 Halmstads BK will compete in Allsvenskan and Svenska Cupen.

Fixtures and results

Pre-season fixtures and results

Allsvenskan

League fixtures and results

League table

Overall league table

Results summary

Results by round

Svenska Cupen

2012–13 Svenska Cupen

Group four fixtures and results

Group four table

Season statistics

Goals

Last updated: 10 April 2013
Source: Match reports in SvFF.se

Disciplinary record

Player information

Squad

Statistics prior to season start only

Squad statistics

Appearances and goals

As of 18 December 2012

|}

Bookings

Transfers

In

Out

References
Footnotes

References

External links
 Halmstads BK homepage
 SvFF homepage

Halmstads BK seasons
Halmstad